Konstantinos Chatzidimpas (born 12 May 1999) is a Greek professional footballer who plays as a defensive midfielder for Super League 2 club Proodeftiki.

References

1999 births
Living people
Greek footballers
Greece youth international footballers
Super League Greece players
Football League (Greece) players
Super League Greece 2 players
PAOK FC players
Ergotelis F.C. players
GAS Ialysos 1948 F.C. players
A.E. Karaiskakis F.C. players
Association football midfielders
Footballers from Thessaloniki